Laura José Ramos Luís (born 15 August 1992) is a Portuguese football forward who plays for Campeonato Nacional de Futebol Feminino club SC Braga and the Portugal women's national football team.

Club career
In May 2017, Luís ended a four-year spell in German football by signing for SC Braga. By March 2018 Luís had already scored 20 goals when she agreed an extension to her contract with Braga. In April her acrobatic bicycle kick goal against Boavista went viral and was compared to a celebrated goal which fellow Madeiran Cristiano Ronaldo had recently scored against Juventus. She finished as the top goalscorer of the 2017–18 Campeonato Nacional de Futebol Feminino, with 32 goals.

International career
Luís scored on her senior debut for the Portugal women's national football team on 17 September 2011, an 8–0 UEFA Women's Euro 2013 qualifying win over Armenia.

She was named by coach Francisco Neto in the 23-player Portugal squad for UEFA Women's Euro 2017 in the Netherlands.

References

External links 
 
 
 Profile at S.C. Braga 

1992 births
Living people
MSV Duisburg (women) players
Portuguese women's footballers
Portugal women's international footballers
Expatriate women's footballers in Germany
Portuguese expatriate sportspeople in Germany
Women's association football forwards
Madeiran footballers
FCR 2001 Duisburg players
FF USV Jena players
USL W-League (1995–2015) players
Frauen-Bundesliga players
Expatriate women's soccer players in the United States
Campeonato Nacional de Futebol Feminino players
S.C. Braga (women's football) players
Sportspeople from Funchal
UEFA Women's Euro 2017 players